Antonio "Tony" Velasquez (29 October 1910 – 1997) is a Filipino illustrator regarded as the Father of Tagalog comics and as the pioneer and founding father of the Philippine comics industry.  He was the creator of Kenkoy, an “iconic Philippine comic strip character”.

Biography

Family background
Velasquez was born in Ulilang Kawayan, Paco, Manila. He was the sixth child of a Pangasinense father, Eusebio Velasquez, and a Caviteña mother, Andrea Santos.

Education
Velasquez studied at the Jose Rizal College. In 1934, he also completed a correspondence course on illustration and drawing from the International Correspondence School.

Early career
While a student at Jose Rizal College, Velasquez worked as a part-time illustrator for Banaag Press, a publishing company which later became known as Acme Printing in 1927 after being acquired by Ramon Roces, a Filipino-Spanish businessman and publisher.  In 1928, Velasquez – together with script writer Romualdo Ramos – created Kenkoy, a “Filipino comic star” character that first appeared in the Tagalog-language Liwayway magazine on 11 January 1929. In 1932, he also created the female equivalent of Kenkoy, Ponyang Halobaybay, a typical portrait of the Filipina woman in American-era Philippines. Other cartoon characters soon followed like Nanong Pandak, Talakitok, Talimusak, and Tinyente Dikyam.

At Roces Publications
In 1935, Velasquez became chief advertising artist for the Ramon Roces Publications, Inc.  As chief advertising artist, Velasquez designed labels for Philippine products such as Tiki-Tiki Vitamins, Castor Oil, and Cortal, among others. Along with such product label designs, Velasquez created cartoon characters that accompanied the advertisements for the products.  The characters Velasquez created included Captain Cortal for Cortal, Nars Cafi for Cafi Aspirina, and Isko for Esco Shoes, among others.

During World War II
During the Japanese Occupation of the Philippines in World War II, Velasquez was forced to use his Kenkoy character as war propaganda to influence the Filipinos.  Refusing at first, then Philippine President Jose P. Laurel was able to convince Velasquez to concede and use Kenkoy as a promotional tool for Laurel’s health programs instead of as war propaganda.

Ace Publications
In 1947, Velasquez retired from Liwayway magazine to create the publishing firm Ace Publication, a mass producer of Philippine comic books.  Through Ace Publication, Velasquez was able to produce “some of the best” and “most popular” Philippine comic books, such as Pilipino Komiks (1947), Tagalog Klasiks (1949), Hiwaga Komiks (1950), Espesyal Komiks (1952), Kenkoy Komiks (1959), and Educational Klasiks Komiks (1961).

At GASI Publications
In 1962, Velasquez had to close Ace Publication due a labor dispute. Afterwards, Velasquez established the Graphic Arts Service, Inc. (also known as GASI Publications). Through GASI Publications, Velasquez was able to produce Philippine comic books such as Pinoy Komiks, Pinoy Klasiks, Aliwan Komiks, Holiday Komiks, Teens Weekly Komiks, and Pioneer Komiks.

Death
Velasquez died in 1997 at the age of 86
.

Influence
Velasquez was the mentor to other Filipino illustrators, namely Francisco Coching (who later became a National Artist for Visual Arts in 2014), Mars Ravelo, Jose Zabala-Santos, and J. M. Perez, among others.

References

Filipino cartoonists
Filipino illustrators
Filipino comics artists
Filipino comics writers
People from Paco, Manila
Artists from Metro Manila
Writers from Metro Manila
1910 births
1997 deaths